Andre Lavor Postell (born February 26, 1978) is an American former professional basketball player. Following a college career at St. John's University, he was selected by the New York Knicks in the second round of the 2000 NBA draft. He played three seasons with the Knicks showing promise when Allan Houston and Latrell Sprewell were sidelined by injuries. During his career, Postell played in 61 games and averaged 3.2 points. His final NBA game was played on April 15th, 2003 in a 93 - 109 loss to the Indiana Pacers where he recorded 4 points and 1 assist. After playing in the NBA, Postell played in Europe and Latin America. At the age of 35, he enlisted in the US Army.

Career Statistics

NBA statistics

|-
| style="text-align:left;"| 2000–01
| style="text-align:left;"| New York
| 26 || 0 || 6.5 || .315 || .273 || .815 || 1.0 || .2 || .2 || .1 || 2.3 
|-
| style="text-align:left;"| 2001–02
| style="text-align:left;"| New York
| 23 || 0 || 7.8 || .333 || .231 || .756 || .7 || .2 || .3 || .0 || 4.0
|-
| style="text-align:left;"| 2002–03
| style="text-align:left;"| New York
| 12 || 0 || 8.2 || .368 || .286 || .867 || .3 || .3 || .2 || .0 || 3.6
|- class="sortbottom"
| style="text-align:center;" colspan="2"| Career
| 61 || 0 || 7.3 || .335 || .250 || .795 || .7 || .2 || .2 || .0 || 3.2

References

External links
NBA Stats Basketball-reference.com
Lega basket Profile

1978 births
Living people
American expatriate basketball people in Belgium
American expatriate basketball people in Colombia
American expatriate basketball people in the Czech Republic
American expatriate basketball people in Greece
American expatriate basketball people in Italy
American expatriate basketball people in Venezuela
American men's basketball players
Asheville Altitude players
BC Nový Jičín players
BC Oostende players
Greek Basket League players
New York Knicks draft picks
New York Knicks players
Olympiacos B.C. players
Panteras de Miranda players
Shooting guards
Small forwards
Sportspeople from Albany, Georgia
St. John's Red Storm men's basketball players
Victoria Libertas Pallacanestro players